A military stamp, is a postage stamp used by a military organisation, in time of war, or while ensuring a peace keeping operation.  Often the letters will be transported by the army itself until they reach the country of destination.  These stamps were widely used during World War II by soldiers wishing to send mail home to their families.  The usage of these stamps has been somewhat phased out by the appearance of electronic means of communication.
Some army issues include:
China Expeditionary Forces (1900-1921)
Indian Expeditionary Forces (1914-1922)
British occupation of Mafia Island (1915-1916)
British Field Office in Salonica (1916)
Nyasaland Field Force (1916)
Egyptian Expeditionary Force (1918)
Indian Expeditionary Force D (1919)
British Forces in Egypt (1932-1939)
Middle East Forces (1942-1947)
East Africa Forces (1943-1946)
Indian National Army (World War II)
Indian Custodian Forces in Korea (1953)
International Commission in Indo-China (1954-1968)
Indian UN Force in Congo (1962)
Indian UN Force in Gaza (1965)

Philatelic terminology
stamp